Moshe Kahlon
 Yoav Galant
 Eli Alaluf
 Michael Oren
 Rachel Azaria
 Tali Ploskov
 Yifat Sasha-Biton
 Eli Cohen
 Roy Folkman
 Meirav Ben-Ari
 Shai Babad
 Akram Hasson
 Tomer Ozen
 Asher Pinthon Siyom
 Rebecca Blistra-Wrotzlboski
 Elias Suleiman
 Shilat Hakshouri
 Naama Harel
 Ariel Almog
 Dalit Harel
 Eran Elias
 Yair Biton
 David Tzioni
 Moshe Shai Ben-David
 Rotem Kakun
 Inbal Tal-Peer
 Gia Loam
 Tzipi Ehrlich
 Orit Agmi
 Zohar Sosenko
 Nirit Eevie
 Moshe Ran
 Shalom Saar

External links
Central Elections Committee Official Kulanu List

Lists of Israeli politicians